The St. Julian's railway bridge is a crossing of the River Usk close to the city of Newport, South Wales. and currently carries the Welsh Marches Line across the river in a north—south direction. Due to the meanderings of the river, all the other crossings are east—west.

The bridge was opened to traffic during 1874 by the Pontypool, Caerleon and Newport Railway. Consisting of four brick-built arches and four wrought iron lattice truss spans with wrought iron cross girders and plate floors, the structure carries a pair of railway lines across the river. In the 1960s, the bridge underwent a strengthening and refurbishment programme; during the early 2010s, the viaduct was again subject to structural repairs and remedial works.

History
The origins of the St. Julian's railway bridge are closely associated with that of the Pontypool, Caerleon and Newport Railway, for whom the structure was built for. Its construction was necessary for the line to traverse the River Usk. The bridge was originally completed during 1874.

The viaduct has been subject to remedial works several times throughout its lifespan. During the 1960s, a major strengthening scheme was conducted under the auspices of nationalised railway operator British Rail. By the early 2010s, detailed surveys of the bridge had determined that the aging structure was once again in need of strengthening, thus national rail infrastructure owner Network Rail appointed Balfour Beatty as the prime contractor for planning and overseeing these works. During a six-month period across 2014, the bridge was subject to significant repairs to its steelwork and masonry, including the installation of additional bracing to strengthen the main deck; a major aim of these works was to increase the bridge's capacity wherever reasonable to do so. Throughout the project, efforts were made to minimise any impact on the passage of river traffic.

References

External links
 
 St Julian's Railway Bridge of Newport (Wales) via visitoruk.com
 St. Julian's railway bridge via latitude.to

Bridges in Newport, Wales
Railway bridges in Wales